High Tension  is an Australian extreme metal band from Melbourne, Victoria. Formed in 2012, the band's original line-up featured Karina Utomo and Ash Pegram from Young and Restless with Matt Weston from The Nation Blue and Damian Coward from Love Like...Electrocution. Only Utomo and Weston remain from the original line-up; with the current formation of the band featuring guitarist Mike Deslandes, also of YLVA, and drummer Lauren Hammel.

Their debut album, Death Beat, was released in October 2013 and was nominated for best hard rock / heavy metal album at the 2014 ARIA Awards.

Band members
Current members
Karina Utomo – lead vocals (2012–present)
Matt Weston – bass (2012–present)
Mike Deslandes – guitar, backing vocals (2015–present)
Lauren Hammel – drums (2015–present)

Former members
Ash Pegram – guitar (2012–2015)
Damian Coward – drums (2012–2013, 2014–2015)
Dan McKay – drums (2013–2014)

Former touring musicians
Allan Stacey – bass (2018)

Discography

Albums

Extended plays

Awards and nominations

AIR Awards
The Australian Independent Record Awards (commonly known informally as AIR Awards) is an annual awards night to recognise, promote and celebrate the success of Australia's Independent Music sector.

|-
| AIR Awards of 2019
| Purge
| Best Independent Hard Rock, Heavy or Punk Album
| 
|-

ARIA Music Awards
The ARIA Music Awards are a set of annual ceremonies presented by Australian Recording Industry Association (ARIA), which recognise excellence, innovation, and achievement across all genres of the music of Australia. They commenced in 1987.

|-
| 2014
| Death Beat
| ARIA Award for Best Hard Rock or Heavy Metal Album
| 
|-

Music Victoria Awards
The Music Victoria Awards are an annual awards night celebrating Victorian music. They commenced in 2006.

! 
|-
| Music Victoria Awards of 2018
| Purge 
| Best Heavy Album
| 
| 
|-

National Live Music Awards
The National Live Music Awards (NLMAs) are a broad recognition of Australia's diverse live industry, celebrating the success of the Australian live scene. The awards commenced in 2016.

|-
| National Live Music Awards of 2016
| Themselves
| Live Hard Rock Act of the Year
| 
|-
| National Live Music Awards of 2017
| Themselves
| Live Hard Rock Act of the Year
| 
|-
| rowspan="2" | National Live Music Awards of 2018
| Themselves
| Live Act of the Year
| 
|-
| Karina Utomo (High Tension)
| Live Voice of the Year
| 
|-
| National Live Music Awards of 2019
| Lauren Hammel (High Tension)
| Live Drummer of the Year
| 
|-

References

Musical groups from Melbourne
2012 establishments in Australia
Musical groups established in 2012
Australian hard rock musical groups